Marta Leśniak (born 15 March 1988) is a Polish former professional tennis player.

Leśniak won ten singles and two doubles titles on the ITF Circuit during her career. On 12 February 2018, she reached her best singles ranking of world No. 418. On 21 March 2005, she peaked at No. 424 in the doubles rankings.

In 2019, she played for Poland in the Military World Games in Wuhan, China where she won two bronze medals, in women's singles and mixed doubles.

Leśniak decided to follow the college route and played for the Southern Methodist University SMU Mustangs varsity tennis team from 2008 to 2011.

She reached the final of the Polish national tennis championships in 2016, and was defeated by Anastasiya Shoshyna, in straight sets.

ITF Circuit finals

Singles: 12 (10 titles, 2 runner–ups)

Doubles: 3 (2 titles, 1 runner–up)

References

External links
 
 

1988 births
Living people
Sportspeople from Wrocław
Polish female tennis players
SMU Mustangs women's tennis players
Polish expatriate sportspeople in the United States
20th-century Polish women
21st-century Polish women